Shovkat Hasan qizi Mammadova (18 April 1897 – 8 June 1981) was an Azerbaijani opera singer (lyric coloratura soprano) and music instructor.

Early life and musical career
Mammadova was born in 1897 in Tiflis, Russian Empire (present-day Tbilisi, Georgia) to the low-class Azeri family of Hasan Mammadov and Khurshid (née Sultanova). She had a younger brother named Mugbil. Her father, a shoemaker who hailed from the village of Goshakilsa (presently in the Bolnisi Municipality, Georgia), noticed her musical gift when Shovkat was six years old. In 1910, he managed to find a sponsor, who agreed to promote her talent at a banquet organized by the vice-regent of the Caucasus, Count Illarion Vorontsov-Dashkov. In 1911, she left for Milan, Italy to pursue a musical degree at the Milan Conservatory with the financial help of an Azeri multimillionaire, Zeynalabdin Taghiyev and his wife Sona. However, in 1912, their sponsorship was discontinued for undisclosed reasons, and Mammadova had to return home. That same year she enrolled in a program at a music school in Tiflis. At the age of 15, she made her first stage appearance at the Taghiyev Theatre in Baku, performing a piece from Uzeyir Hajibeyov's Husband and Wife. In 1915, she got admitted to a post-secondary program at the Kiev Conservatory, where she met Reinhold Glière, a Russian composer. Glière showed keen interest in Azeri folk music and Mammadova's acquaintanceship resulted in his visit to the Karabakh region, where he got to meet with a number of professional mugham performers. Later in 1934, he would compose his famous Shakh-Senem based on his impressions and experiences from this trip, and dedicate it to Mammadova. By that time, she would already be widely known as a talented opera singer. Beginning in 1921, Mammadova toured Moscow, Saint Petersburg, Paris, Milan, Tabriz, and Tbilisi performing arias from La Traviata, Barber of Seville, Rigoletto, Les Huguenots, etc. She also managed to complete her studies in Milan in 1927–1930 and head back to Azerbaijan to go on with her career at the State Opera and Ballet Theatre in Baku.

Career as a music instructor
In 1923, Shovkat Mammadova founded the Musical Notes Publishing House as well as the Baku Theatrical College (nowadays known as the Azerbaijan State University of Culture and Arts). In 1939–1945, she was the director of the Azerbaijan State Opera and Ballet Theatre. She was later appointed the Chair of the Vocal Department at the Azerbaijan State Conservatory, where she professionally trained young vocalists until her death in 1981.

Family
In 1915, while studying at the Kiev Conservatory, Mammadova married Jacob Lubarsky, an engineer whom she had met in Milan three years earlier.

References

See also
 List of People's Artists of the Azerbaijan SSR

1897 births
1981 deaths
20th-century Azerbaijani women opera singers
Georgian Azerbaijanis
Musicians from Tbilisi
People's Artists of the USSR
People's Artists of the Azerbaijan SSR
Soviet Azerbaijani people
Milan Conservatory alumni
Kyiv Conservatory alumni
Recipients of the Order of Lenin